Puglia is the Italian name for Apulia, a historical and administrative region of Southern Italy.

Puglia may also refer to:

People
Giuseppe Puglia (1600–1636), an Italian painter
Nareshkumar Chunnalal Puglia (born 1948), an Indian politician
Frank Puglia (1892–1975), an Italian film actor
Marianne Puglia, a Venezuelan Miss Earth
Busa of Canosa di Puglia, an Apulian noblewoman of the 3rd century BC

Other
Puglia Channel, an Italian television station 
Giro di Puglia, a cycling race in Apulia
Gentile di Puglia, a breed of sheep 
Italian cruiser Puglia, a warship of the Royal Italian Navy

See also 
 
 Apulia (disambiguation)
 Pulia (disambiguation)

Italian-language surnames